Dysstroma infuscata is a moth of the family Geometridae first described by Johan Martin Jakob von Tengström in 1869. It is found from Scandinavia, Poland and the Czech Republic to the Amur River and Sakhalin.

The wingspan is 23–32 mm. Adults are on wing in July.

The larvae feed on Vaccinium myrtillus, Vaccinium uliginosum and Rhododendron tomentosum. Larvae can be found from August to June. The species overwinters in the larval stage.

References

External links
Fauna Europaea

Cidariini
Moths of Europe
Moths of Asia